The South Shore Anchors Rugby Football Club is a rugby union team based in Weymouth, Massachusetts, United States. The club competes in, and is governed by, the New England Rugby Football Union (their LAU), the Northeast Rugby Union (their TAU), and USA Rugby.

The team has about 30-40 active players and is member of Division I of the New England Rugby Football Union.

References

External links
 Official site
 New England Rugby Football Union

1999 establishments in Massachusetts
Rugby clubs established in 1999
Rugby union teams in Boston
Sports in Norfolk County, Massachusetts
Weymouth, Massachusetts